Jochen Dauer (born 10 January 1952) is a German former racing driver and founder of Dauer Sportwagen.
In the beginning of 2010 Jochen was in detention of a suspect in Nuremberg because of tax evasion. On the 27. July 2010 it was announced, that he has to go to prison for 42 months.
retrieved 25.6.2016

References

1952 births
Living people
German racing drivers
European Formula Two Championship drivers
FIA European Formula 3 Championship drivers
German Formula Three Championship drivers
Deutsche Tourenwagen Masters drivers

Walter Lechner Racing drivers
World Sportscar Championship drivers